"I Will Follow" is a song by  rock band U2. It is the opening track from their debut album, Boy, and it was released as the album's second single in October 1980. Lead singer Bono wrote the lyrics to "I Will Follow" in tribute to his mother, who died when he was 14 years old.

"I Will Follow" is the only song that U2 have performed on every tour since they released their first album. The song was U2's first music video, directed by Meiert Avis in Dublin, Ireland. The song was issued five times, first in 1981 on a 7" vinyl in Ireland, the United Kingdom, Australia, and New Zealand, second on the same format in the United States and Canada, third in the Netherlands in 1982 with a track from 1981's October, in 1983 with a live version of the song, and finally in 2011 with a live version of the song recorded at the 2011 Glastonbury Festival.

Composition
"I Will Follow" was written three weeks before U2 began recording Boy. During early rehearsals of the song, the group frequently had loud arguments, as lead vocalist Bono was struggling to convey the aggression for the guitar riff that he was envisioning. Frustrated, he took the Edge's guitar from him and "hammer[ed] away" on the two-stringed chord the Edge had created to show his bandmates the urgency he wanted. Bono said, "It was literally coming out of a kind of rage, the sound of a nail being hammered into your frontal lobe". Producer Steve Lillywhite stated that Siouxsie and the Banshees guitarist John McKay's playing on the song "Jigsaw Feeling" (1978) was a point of reference for the Edge on "I Will Follow", calling the beginning of both songs "almost identical".

Bono has said that he wrote the lyrics from the perspective of his mother Iris, who died in 1974 when he was 14 years old, and that they were about the unconditional love a mother has for her child. The song features a glockenspiel to provide what Bono called "underlying instrumental colouring"; it was added at his suggestion, and was played during the Boy recording sessions by him and the Edge. For the middle eight section of the song, Lillywhite recorded the sounds of cutlery rubbing against the spokes of a spinning wheel on an upturned bicycle, as well as Bono smashing bottles.

Release
Record World reviewed the original single release in 1980, describing the song as an "electronic rocker" in which the "urgent vocals match the intense keyboard pulse." 

"I Will Follow" had a second single release as a live version in the Netherlands and Germany in 1982, and a third release in the United States in 1983, taken from the Under a Blood Red Sky album. It appeared on both the compilation album and video collection The Best of 1980–1990, and in some countries, on the U218 Singles compilation.

The song is included in the 2015 music video game Rock Band 4 as a playable track.

Live performances
It is the band's second most frequently performed song with over 1000 performances, only behind Pride (In the Name of Love). It has been performed at every concert of The Joshua Tree, PopMart Tour, Innocence + Experience Tour and Experience + Innocence Tours. It has been played extensively on every tour; exceptions to this are the Zoo TV Tour (where it was performed infrequently as part of the acoustic set), the U2 360° Tour (where it wasn't played until the third leg) and The Joshua Tree Tour 2017 (where it was sporadically performed as the concert closer). For The Joshua Tree Tour 2019 however, it was again played regularly as the second song of the show.

The song appears on the live recordings/films Under a Blood Red Sky, U2 Live at Red Rocks: Under a Blood Red Sky, Live from the Point Depot, PopMart: Live from Mexico City, Elevation 2001: Live from Boston, Live from Boston 1981, Live from Paris, and U22. It also appears on Vertigo 05: Live from Milan, the bonus DVD that is included with the U218 Singles compilation and as a bonus track for UK/Australia releases of the CD.

U2 performed the song on the BBC2 television show The Old Grey Whistle Test in 1981.  The performance was later released on DVD on a compilation of performances from the show.

Reception and legacy
In 2005, Blender ranked the song at number 214 on its list "The 500 Greatest Songs Since You Were Born". The magazine wrote, "The first song on U2's first album introduced the guitar sound that would define their work. [...] The arena-ready clarion call also established Bono's trademark lyrical earnestness, one of the reasons the song remains a fan favorite and a staple of the band's recent tours."

Formats and track listings

Note
The Netherlands release was recorded for the Veronica TV concert series Countdown, and was reissued in Germany in 1983. The cover of the Canadian and U.S. releases feature the same image as the North American release of Boy. The 1983 release was in a generic red sleeve with no cover artwork.

Personnel
Bono – vocals, glockenspiel
The Edge – guitar, backing vocals
Adam Clayton – bass guitar
Larry Mullen Jr. – drums

Charts

1981 release

1982 release

1983 release

See also
List of covers of U2 songs – I Will Follow

References
Footnotes

Bibliography

External links
 I Will Follow Lyrics
 I Will Follow performance history

1980 singles
1981 singles
1983 singles
U2 songs
Columbia Records singles
Island Records singles
Live singles
Commemoration songs
Songs written by Bono
Songs written by the Edge
Songs written by Adam Clayton
Songs written by Larry Mullen Jr.
Song recordings produced by Steve Lillywhite
Music videos directed by Meiert Avis
2011 singles
1980 songs